Johnnie Cowan (May 31, 1913 – October 24, 1993) was an American infielder in Negro league baseball. He played between 1934 and 1948.

References

External links
 and Seamheads

1913 births
1993 deaths
People from Dallas County, Alabama
Birmingham Black Barons players
Cleveland Buckeyes players
Memphis Red Sox players
Baseball players from Alabama
20th-century African-American sportspeople